Usolsky District is an administrative district, one of the thirty-three in Irkutsk Oblast, Russia. Municipally, it is incorporated as Usolsky Municipal District. It is located in the southern part of the oblast and borders Bokhansky District in the north, Angarsky, Shelekhovsky, and Slyudyansky Districts in the east, the Republic of Buryatia in the south, and Cheremkhovsky District in the west. Its administrative center is the urban locality (a work settlement) of Belorechensky. As of the 2010 Census, the total population of the district was 50,334, with the population of Belorechensky accounting for 15.9% of that number.

History
The district was established in 1925.

Administrative and municipal status
Within the framework of administrative divisions, Usolsky District is one of the thirty-three in the oblast. Until November 2016, the town of Usolye-Sibirskoye served as its administrative center, despite being incorporated separately as an administrative unit with the status equal to that of the districts. In November 2016, the administrative center was transferred to the work settlement of Belorechensky.

As a municipal division, the district is incorporated as Usolsky Municipal District. Since November 2016, the work settlement of Belorechensky serves as the administrative center of both the administrative and municipal district.

Military
A major Long Range Aviation base, Belaya, is located in the district.

References

Notes

Sources

Districts of Irkutsk Oblast
States and territories established in 1925